Firearm ownership in Yemen is considered as right rather than privilege, and therefore is allowed without any license or permit. Carry is unrestricted in the country. Yemen is the second most armed country in the world. (128 guns for every 100 residents).

History

Up until the second half of the 20th century, Yemenis traditionally carried a jambiya dagger and  using weapons was regulated by tribal laws. The flood of guns in the country led to the extinction of those traditions. A new permissive gun culture replaced the code of honor and chivalry.

In 1992 Yemeni government passed Law Regulating Carrying Firearms, Ammunition & their Trade. Article 9 of this law states that:

The law did not specify, however, which authority would ensure the control of arms proliferation.

In 2007, the government issued a decree banning weapons in major cities and limiting weapons carried by security personnel. In three years, 720,000 unlicensed weapons were confiscated, and hundreds of weapons shops were temporarily closed down. The Arab Spring broke this dynamic.

After civil war began in 2015 various parts of the country were overrun by different factions. Since there is no centralized government to enforce gun laws all types of arms including rifles, fully-automatic firearms, anti-tank guide missiles or armored vehicles are being sold over the counter for various militias and individuals willing to buy them.

In October 2018, the Arab Reporters for Investigative Journalism released a study demonstrating many guns in Yemen were manufactured by European weapon makers.

Carry

A license is not required to obtain or possess firearms. Carry of firearms in public places is unrestricted in rural areas, where more than 66% of Yemen's population live, but state-issued license is required to carry them in cities. It is issued on may-issue basis with varying restrictions in different cities. In 2007 government cancelled all carry licenses and introduced new additional conditions for them. Carrying rifles (for example AK-47) was banned in cities with few exceptions.

Government's license is also required to be retailer of arms and ammunition, including maintaining records of stocks and sales, buyer's name and ID card. Law also regulates the number of bodyguards person can have, and stipulates that guns may not be passed on to third parties.

Celebratory gunfire also lead to many deaths every year. Many children, mostly boys, carry guns in Yemen.

Firearm ownership 
According to 2017 Small Arms Survey there are roughly 15 million civilian-held firearms in Yemen or 62 per 100 population, making Yemen the second most armed country in the world after the United States.

See also 
 Overview of gun laws by nation

Sources

Yemen
Law
Law of Yemen